The Battle of Kowel (also known as the Battle of Kovel or the Battle of Kovel-Stanislav) took place during World War I, from 24 July to 8 August 1916. It began with an Austrian counter-attack by Alexander von Linsingen south of Kowel, a city located in the Volyn Oblast (province), in north-western Ukraine. Linsingen intended to halt the Russian offensive under the command of General Aleksei Alekseevich Brusilov.

Background

The Brusilov offensive began on 4 June 1916, it was the greatest Russian feat of arms during World War I, and among the most lethal battles in world history. It was a major offensive against the armies of the Central Powers on the Eastern Front. Mounting pressure from the western Allies caused the Russians to hurry their preparations. Brusilov amassed four armies totalling 40 infantry divisions and 15 cavalry divisions. He faced 39 Austrian infantry divisions and 10 cavalry divisions formed in a row of three defensive lines, although later German reinforcements were brought up.

The breakthrough came when, on 4 June, the Russians opened the offensive with a massive, accurate, but brief artillery barrage against the Austro-Hungarian lines. On 8 June Russian forces of the South-western Front took Lutsk. By now the Austrians were in full retreat and the Russians had taken over 200,000 prisoners, however Brusilov's forces were becoming overextended. In a meeting held on the same day Lutsk fell, German Chief of Staff Erich von Falkenhayn persuaded Austrian Field Marshal Franz Conrad von Hötzendorf to redeploy troops from the Italian Front to counter the Russians in Galicia. General Paul von Hindenburg was again able to capitalize on good railroads to bring German reinforcements east. At last, on 18 June, a weak and poorly-prepared offensive commenced under Alexei Evert, and on 24 July Alexander von Linsingen commenced his own counter-attack. Brusilov and Russian Tsar Nicholas II ordered other Russian commanders to commence their own attacks, however high casualties and internal rivalry meant that this did not occur.

The battle

The Tsar had provided large amounts of artillery and shells for Brusilov's army, however this had repercussions for the Russians as Brusilov reverted to the tactic of extensive barrages followed by waves of advancing soldiers, a tactic that had proved unsuccessful since 1915 with German commanders observing the new similarities between Kowel and the Western Front. 

The German commander, Linsingen, sought to check the Russian army under the command of General Brusilov. The Russian force of 29 Infantry and 12 Cavalry divisions faced only 12 Austrian divisions, however the ineffective barrage and the tactic of using 'waves' of attacking soldiers resulting in significant Russian casualties and the stalling of the Brusilov offensive.

Consequences

The 500,000 Russian casualties during the offensive, culminating in the battle of Kowel "finished Russia as an active participant in the war" with its consumption of men and resources. Sir George Buchanan (diplomat) British Ambassador to the Russian Empire, expressed his view about results in the battle: «The losses which Russia has suffered are so colossal that whole country is mourning. So many lives have been uselessly sacrificed in the recent unsuccessful attacks against Kovel and other places, that the impression is gaining ground that is useless continuing the struggle, and that Russia, unlike Great Britain, has nothing to gain by prolonging the war».  The battle also had a far reaching impact on Austria, as it illustrated the country's reliance on Germany as well as deprived the nation of large numbers of fighting men. Romania, relying on a Russian success during the conflict, was overrun by Austria-Hungary, Germany and Bulgaria shortly after Russia's defeat. With the armed forces of both Germany and Austria-Hungary losing confidence in their monarchs as a result of the engagement, and with its effective removal of Russia from the war, the battle of Kowel remains one of the most influential of the war.

Notes

References

 Lanning, Michael Lee The Battle 100: the stories behind history's most influential battles, 2003 
 Stone, Norman Europe Transformed, 1878-1919, 1999 
 Buchanan, George My Mission to Russia, 2013 

1916 in Austria-Hungary
Conflicts in 1916
Battles of World War I involving Austria-Hungary
Battles of the Eastern Front (World War I)
Battles of World War I involving Germany
Battles of World War I involving Russia
1916 in the Russian Empire
July 1916 events
August 1916 events